Nicolás Novello (born 20 May 1946) is an Argentine-Italian former football player and head coach. A forward, he played for clubs in Argentina, Chile and Mexico.

Playing career
Novello was born in Cosenza, Italy. He played for Argentine club Boca Juniors, with whom he won the Argentine Primera División in 1969 and 1970 and the Copa Argentina in 1969.

 Boca Juniors 1966–1972
 Atlante 1973
 Boca Juniors 1974
 Banfield 1975
 Unión Española 1976–1978

Coaching career
 Unión Española 1981
 Boca Juniors (Inferiors) 1989–1995

Honours

Player
Boca Juniors
 Argentine Primera División: 1969, 1970
 Copa Argentina: 1969

Unión Española
 Chilean Primera División: 1977

References

External links
 

1946 births
Living people
Argentine people of Italian descent
Naturalized citizens of Argentina
Argentine footballers
Italian footballers
Association football forwards
Club Atlético Banfield footballers
Boca Juniors footballers
Atlante F.C. footballers
Unión Española footballers
Chilean Primera División players
Argentine Primera División players
Liga MX players
Argentine football managers
Italian football managers
Italian expatriate footballers
Argentine expatriate footballers
Italian expatriate sportspeople in Chile
Argentine expatriate sportspeople in Chile
Expatriate footballers in Chile
Expatriate football managers in Chile
Italian expatriate sportspeople in Mexico
Argentine expatriate sportspeople in Mexico
Expatriate footballers in Mexico